Edasi (Estonian: Forward) was a newspaper published in Tartu, Estonia. The paper was published with this name between 1948 and 1994.

History and profile
The paper was the successor of Postimees of which the name was changed to Edasi in 1948 to make the paper more Soviet. It worked, and the paper became a true Soviet publication. Its headquarters was in Tartu. The paper was controlled by the Tartu Communist Party. However, it was one of the Estonian media outlets not used by the Soviet officials to control Estonians.

Edasi was first a local paper, but later it became a national publication. During the period between 1955 and 1979 when Estonia was subject to the mental Sovietization it was one of the publications which contained political humor. At the same time the paper also published travel stories and literary reviews.

In 1994 Edasi regained its original name, Postimees.

References

1948 establishments in Estonia
1994 disestablishments in Estonia
Communist newspapers
Defunct newspapers published in Estonia
Eastern Bloc mass media
Estonian-language newspapers
Mass media in Tartu
Publications established in 1948
Publications disestablished in 1994